Nicolaus Ragvaldi (Latinized form of Swedish Nils Ragvaldsson) (born in the early 1380s and died on 17 February 1448) was bishop of Växjö and from 1438–1448 archbishop of Uppsala, Sweden. He is known as an early representative of the Gothicist tradition.

On 12 November 1434 he held a speech at the council of Basel, where he argued that the Swedish monarch, Eric of Pomerania, was a successor to the Gothic kings, and that the Swedish delegation deserved senior rank. The Spanish delegation responded with a claim of seniority because of the Visigoths. Notes of these speeches were written down and preserved, and included by Johannes Magnus when he wrote the influential History of the Nordic People about 150 years later. His research results resulted in Gustav Vasa's son styling himself as Eric XIV, although his father disapproved.

References
Article Nils Ragvaldsson from the Nordisk Familjebok (Swedish)

1380s births
Roman Catholic archbishops of Uppsala
15th-century Roman Catholic archbishops in Sweden
Nicolaus Ragvaldi
Bishops of Växjö